Tales From Sadness is the debut album from Italian progressive metal band Raintime. It was released in 2005.

Track listing 

 Moot-Lie
 Faithland
 Creation
 The Experiment
 Denied Recollection
 Chains of Sadness
 Using the Light Forever
 Daily Execution/Paradox Defeat

2005 debut albums
Raintime albums